Edward Litton may refer to:
 Edward Litton (1787–1870), Irish Member of Parliament (MP) for Coleraine 1837–1843
 Edward Falconer Litton (1827–1890), Irish Member of Parliament for Tyrone 1880–1841
Ed Litton (Harry Edward Litton Jr., born 1959), president of the Southern Baptist Convention 2021-